The 2022 Asian Para Games, also known as the IV Asian Para Games, and commonly known as the Hangzhou 2023 Asian Para Games, is a multi-sport event that parallels the 2022 Asian Games which will held for Asian athletes with disability in Hangzhou, Zhejiang, China from 22 to 28 October 2023. Hangzhou will be the second Chinese city to host the Asian Para Games, after Guangzhou in 2010.

The Games were originally scheduled to take place from 9 to 15 October 2022, but due to the COVID-19 pandemic, on 17 May 2022, the event was postponed whereas new date will be announced later.

Host city 
As is the tradition of the event, since 2010, the Asian Para Games are usually held after every Asian Games in the same host country. On 16 September 2018, the Asian Paralympic Committee announced that Hangzhou in Zhejiang Province, China will host the fourth edition of the Asian Para Games after making a visit there in July. The city was previously awarded the 2022 Asian Games on 16 September 2015 by the Olympic Council of Asia.

Development and preparation

Marketing

Emblem
The official emblem of the 2022 Asian Para Games was unveiled on 2 March 2020 and featured a wheelchair athlete striving forward on a running track with 10 semi-arc lines.

Mascot
Fei Fei, a character inspired by the divine bird of the Liangzhu culture was unveiled online on April 16, 2020, as the official mascot of the Games.

Motto
The official motto of the 2022 Asian Para Games, "Hearts meet, Dreams shine" was unveiled on the same day as the emblem.

The Games

Sports
The Games featured 22 sports (in 24 disciplines) which were split into many events, including Para Taekwondo, Para Canoe and Go which were included for the first time in the games' programme and Blind Football and Rowing which were not featured at the 2018 edition will return. The organizing committee chose to drop the bowling events held at the 3 previous edition.

For the edition event, 438 of 539 events present on 2020 Summer Paralympics program will be held.

Participation 
All 43 National Paralympic Committees who are members of the Asian Paralympic Committee are expected to compete.

See also 
 2022 Asian Games
 2022 Winter Paralympics

Notes

References 

 
Asian Para Games
Asian Para Games
Asian Para Games
Multi-sport events in China
Sports events postponed due to the COVID-19 pandemic
Asian Para Games 2022
Asian Para Games